Saat Kadam  (English: Seven steps) is a 2016 Indian fictional sports-drama film, it revolves around the generation gap and the relationship between a father and his son. It stars Amit Sadh, Deeksha Seth, Ronit Roy Nivaan Sen and Karmveer Choudhary in lead roles.

Cast
 Amit Sadh 
 Deeksha Seth
 Ronit Roy
 Nivaan Sen 
 Karmveer Choudhary
 Akash mukherjee
 Saar Kashyap

References

External links

2016 films
Indian sports drama films
2010s Hindi-language films
2010s sports drama films
2016 drama films